NLZ can refer to:

 Neue Luzerner Zeitung
 Noise Level Zero, a successor of the Byte Information Exchange
 Number of leading zeros, see Find first set